Lied Glacier is a glacier close north of Cape Arkona on the southwest side of Heard Island in the southern Indian Ocean. To the southeast of Lied Glacier is Gotley Glacier, whose terminus is located between Cape Arkona and Cape Labuan. Cape Arkona separates Lied Glacier from Gotley Glacier. To the north of Lied Glacier is Abbotsmith Glacier.

Discovery and naming
Lied Glacier was surveyed by Australian National Antarctic Research Expeditions (ANARE) in 1948. It was named by the Antarctic Names Committee of Australia for N.T. Lied, a radio operator and weather observer with ANARE on Heard Island in the years 1951 and 1963, respectively.

References

Further reading

External links
Map of Heard Island and McDonald Islands, including all major topographical features
Australian Antarctic Division
Australian Antarctic Gazetteer
Composite Gazetteer of Antarctica
Australian Antarctic Names and Medals Committee (AANMC)
Scientific Committee on Antarctic Research (SCAR)

Glaciers of Heard Island and McDonald Islands